Alexandre Fortin (born February 25, 1997) is a Canadian professional ice hockey left winger who is currently playing with the  Hershey Bears in the American Hockey League (AHL). He has formerly played with the Chicago Blackhawks of the National Hockey League (NHL).

Playing career
Fortin was drafted in the second round of the 2013 QMJHL draft by the Rouyn-Noranda Huskies. He helped the Huskies win their first Presidents Trophy Cup during the 2015–16 season.

On September 25, 2016, Fortin signed a three-year contract with the Blackhawks as an undrafted free agent. He was assigned to their American Hockey League affiliate, the Rockford IceHogs, to start the 2017–18 season with. 

In the following 2018–19 season, on October 9, 2018, after Andreas Martinsen suffered a back injury, he was recalled from the IceHogs by Chicago. He recorded his first career NHL goal on October 21, in a 6-3 loss to the Tampa Bay Lightning.

Following the conclusion of his entry-level contract with the Blackhawks, Fortin as an impending restricted free agent was not tendered a qualifying offer and was released to free agency. Approaching the delayed 2020–21 season, Fortin was signed to a one-year contract to continue in the AHL with the Colorado Eagles, the primary affiliate to the Colorado Avalanche on January 6, 2021. In the pandemic delayed 2020–21 season, Fortin struggled to find his role within the Eagles, registering just 3 assists in 23 regular season games. He made one post-season divisional playoff game appearance before leaving the club at the conclusion of his contract.

As a free agent, Fortin continued within the AHL, securing a one-year contract with hometown provincial club, the Laval Rocket, on July 6, 2021. On August 22, 2022, the Hershey Bears signed Fortin.

Personal life
Fortin's uncle is goaltender Jean-Sébastien Giguère who played in the NHL for 16 years with the Anaheim Ducks, Toronto Maple Leafs, and Colorado Avalanche.

Career statistics

References

External links
 

1997 births
Canadian ice hockey left wingers
Chicago Blackhawks players
Colorado Eagles players
Hershey Bears players
Ice hockey people from Quebec
Laval Rocket players
Living people
Rockford IceHogs (AHL) players
Rouyn-Noranda Huskies players
People from Blainville, Quebec
South Carolina Stingrays players
Trois-Rivières Lions players
Undrafted National Hockey League players